The nose flute is a musical instrument often played in Polynesia and the Pacific Rim countries. Other versions are found in Africa.

Hawaii 
In the North Pacific, in the Hawaiian islands the nose flute was a common courting instrument. In Hawaiian, it is variously called hano, "nose flute", by the more specific term ʻohe hano ihu, "bamboo flute [for] nose," or ʻohe hanu ihu, "bamboo [for] nose breath".

It is made from a single bamboo section. According to Arts and Crafts of Hawai`i by Te Rangi Hiroa, old flutes in the Bishop Museum collection have a hole at the nose area for the breath, and two or three fingering holes. In the three-finger-hole specimen, one fingering hole is placed near the breath hole.

Oral tradition in various families states that numbers of fingering holes ranged from one to four, and location of the holes varied depending on the musical taste of the player. Though primarily a courting instrument played privately and for personal enjoyment, it also could be used in conjunction with chants, song, and hula. Kumu hula (dance masters), were said to be able to either make the flute sound as though it were chanting, or to chant as they played. Kumu hula Leilehua Yuen is one of the few contemporary Hawaiian musicians to perform with the nose flute in this manner.

Africa 

In the Congo, the nose flute is played by eight ethnic groups.

Philippines 

In the Philippines, the nose flute (pitung ilong in Tagalog), or the kalaleng of the northern Bontok people (tongali among the Kalinga people), is played with the extreme forward edge of the right or left nostril. Because the kalaleng is long and has a narrow internal diameter, it is possible to play different harmonics through overblowing—even with the rather weak airflow from one nostril. Thus, this nose flute can play notes in a range of two and a half octaves. Finger holes in the side of the bamboo tube change the operating length, giving various scales. Players plug the other nostril to increase the force of their breath through the flute.

Taiwan

In Southern Taiwan, Paiwan people play twin-pipes nose flute. They also play twin-pipes mouth flute.

New Zealand 

Historically in New Zealand, the Māori carved nguru from wood, the stem of a gourd and whale's teeth. Nguru were often adorned with very elaborate carvings, befitting what is considered a sacred object. Although Nguru are commonly known as nose flutes, it is only the smaller instruments that can be played with the nose, more commonly Nguru are played with the mouth.

The Māori kōauau ponga ihu, a gourd nose flute, was also part of the nose flute tradition; note that a similarly constructed gourd nose flute, ipu ho kio kio was also used in Hawaii. The maker would form a nose hole in the neck (or stem) of the gourd, by cutting off the neck at a fairly small cross section. This small hole is placed under the player's nostril, in order to generate the flute-tone. The "kōauau ponga ihu" functions as an ocarina in its acoustic principles. Several notes of a scale can be obtained by drilling fingerholes into the "bowl" of the gourd.

Tonga
A variation, the 'Fangufangu' nose flute of the island of Tonga is made with intact node walls at both ends of the bamboo tube, with the nostril holes on the side in front of the nodes (along with side finger holes) and a hole in the middle of the tube, acting as a vent hole, and taking the place of the open distal end. Thus the 'Fangufangu' can be played from either end, and the disposition of the fingerholes differ from node to vent hole so two alternating scales can be played, but only one scale at a time.

See also 
 Nose whistle

Notes

Sources

External links 

 `Ohe Hano Ihu page in Ka`ahele Hawai`i on traditional Hawaiian nose flute
 Hawaiian nose flute - 'Ohe hano ihu sound clip performed by Ranga Pae
 Samples at the whistle museum.
 Māori Nguru in the collection of the Museum of New Zealand Te Papa Tongarewa
 Noseflute.org - Blog dedicated to modern nose flutes

 
Philippine musical instruments
Central African Republic musical instruments
Hawaiian musical instruments
Māori musical instruments
Polynesian musical instruments